Jesse Travis is a Canadian politician, who was the interim leader of the New Brunswick New Democratic Party from November 2010 to March 2011.

Travis previously ran as the party's candidate in New Maryland-Sunbury West in the 2010 provincial election, and in Fredericton in the 2008 and 2011 federal elections.

Electoral history

References

New Brunswick New Democratic Party leaders
Living people
Candidates in New Brunswick provincial elections
New Democratic Party candidates for the Canadian House of Commons
New Brunswick candidates for Member of Parliament
Year of birth missing (living people)